General Hospital Nurses' Home is a registered historic building in Cincinnati, Ohio, listed in the National Register on June 10, 2005.

Historic uses 
Institutional Housing

Notes 

National Register of Historic Places in Cincinnati